Myriad Botanical Gardens is a 15-acre botanical garden in Oklahoma City’s downtown district offering visitors seasonal activities such as bulb displays, concerts, movies, classes, annual children’s festivals and more. Visitors can also explore the Inasmuch Foundation Crystal Bridge Conservatory, which features exterior grounds that are free to roam and observe.

Education 

The Myriad Botanical Gardens provides multiple education opportunities for youth and adults throughout each calendar year. 

The Rainforest Ecology Activity Program (REAP) is geared towards second and fourth graders.  It concentrates on specific themes in biology, ecology while employing a hands-on, inquiry-based approach to understanding.

Roaming the Rainforest summer education program provides a basic level of understanding of ecology, with specific focus on Rainforest education and conservation.  It is held each Tuesday and Wednesday in June and July, open to general, daycare, church and homeschool groups.

The annual Oklahoma Gardening School is one of the Gardens' signature events.  Held typically the first Saturday in March, the Oklahoma Gardening School is an all-day seminar featuring acclaimed garden experts from Oklahoma and the South / Southwest regions of the US.  Topics change annually and may range from best trees and shrubs for Oklahoma gardens, to sustainable vegetable gardening, gardening for floral arrangements and more.

Art in the Gardens 
The Myriad Botanical Gardens is home to several pieces of art. Gateway by Hans Van de Bovenkamp stands on a raised berm at the northeast corner of the Gardens. Childhood is Everlasting (1992) by Robin Orbach is installed in the southwest quadrant of the grounds. Philodendron Dome is located on the northwest side of the lake and consists of a dome-shaped framework on an 8' x 9' base made of iron and bronze. Iron vines support the "dome" of this bronze plant's leaves, where visitors can enter for a view from underneath.

Flying Fish by Kenny McCage is a kinetic sculpture in the Gardens' east lake. Land of the Brave and the Free is a kinetic wind sculpture composed of bright colors and archetypal shapes. It located on the west side of the Gardens. It was donated in 2002 to the Festival of the Arts by California artist Susan Pascal Beran. The Spirit Poles are adjacent to the north fountain plaza, and were gifts to the City of Oklahoma City from the City of Tulsa in commemoration of Oklahoma's centennial of statehood in 2007.

Annual events
 Oklahoma Gardening School: All-day gardening seminar featuring various speakers educating the public on a variety of Oklahoma-related gardening topics.
 Orchids in October: The Myriad Gardens Foundation hosts this three-day event celebrating orchids. An orchid sale and luncheon honoring the Foundation's Crystal Award recipient are part of the festivities. Orchids in the Crystal Bridge are at their peak during this time. The event serves as a fundraiser for the Myriad Gardens Foundation.
 Downtown in December: The Gardens light up beginning in late November to take part in Downtown OKC, Inc's "Downtown in December" event. Thousands of twinkling lights await visitors throughout the  outdoor gardens, and inside the Crystal Bridge Tropical Conservatory.

References 

OKC 
Encyclopedia 
“Myriad Botanical Garden- the centerpiece of the city.” The Journal Record. Max Nichols. October 12, 2000.
“OKC Events.” The Journal Record. Joan Gilmore. October 6, 2008.
KOCO News 5 
“In the tropics of Oklahoma.” Southern Living. Thomas Lee. February 1993. V.28.
"These Walls: The Crystal Bridge."  The Journal Record. Kelley Chambers. April 27, 2009.

External links

 

Agricultural buildings and structures in Oklahoma
Botanical gardens in Oklahoma
Geography of Oklahoma City
Greenhouses in the United States
Protected areas of Oklahoma County, Oklahoma
Tourist attractions in Oklahoma City
Urban public parks